Ilmar Mändmets (born 30 April 1944 Mõisaküla) is an Estonian agronomist and politician. He was a member of VII Riigikogu. 1995–1997, he was Minister of Agriculture.

References

Living people
1944 births
Members of the Riigikogu, 1992–1995
Members of the Riigikogu, 1995–1999
Agriculture ministers of Estonia